John Loftus may refer to:

 John Loftus (author) (born 1950), military author and radio talk show host
 John Loftus, 2nd Marquess of Ely (1770–1845), peer and Member of Parliament in Ireland and the United Kingdom
 John W. Loftus (born 1954), atheist author and former minister
 Johnny Loftus (1895–1976), American jockey